Torture Garden (or TG) is a fetish club in London, UK. The club started in 1990 and is now Europe's largest fetish club.  It features dance floors, musical acts, performance art, fashion shows, and an S&M 'dungeon'.

Initially threatened with closure by the police, it is now described as "legendary" and "a capital institution" by Time Out magazine. It has also been described as "a combination of a fetish, S/M, body art, Modern Primitives, straight, gay, performance art, body ritual, fashion, techno/industrial/atmospheric music, multimedia, and cyberspace club".

Atmosphere

The co-founder of TG described the experience as "like entering a scene from a movie", and said that "we are basically about the celebration of sexuality and fantasy in a safe environment". A lack of intimidating or threatening behaviour is characteristic of the club, in contrast to most nightclubs. One journalist reported the "welcoming, liberating, anything-goes atmosphere".

There is a strict dress code: "Fantasy Fetish, SM, Body Art, Drag, Rubber, Leather, PVC goes, but no cotton t-shirts, street wear, or regular club wear". This has been summarised as "if what you’re wearing wouldn’t get you stared at in the street, don’t bother even queuing up to get in".

Events
TG has hosted club nights in several other cities and countries, including Edinburgh Russia, Greece and Japan, and it also runs a Fetish fashion label. TG ran a live stage show as the centerpiece of the Erotica exhibition at Olympia in 2004, and hosted a night at the Barbican Centre art gallery to coincide with the "Seduced" exhibition.

Rubber Banned, an exhibit of photographs of TG club-goers taken by fashion photographer Perou was shown in London and Paris in 2005.

Celebrity attendees
Marilyn Manson, Dita Von Teese (who had her UK debut at TG), performance artist Franko B, Jean Paul Gaultier, Boy George, 90's punk band Fluffy, Jack Dee, and Marc Almond have all been to TG nights.

See also
Body modification
Sexuality and gender identity-based cultures
Nightclubs
Performance art
Sex club
Sexual fetishism
Slimelight

References

External links

BDSM organizations
Sexual fetishism
Nightclubs in London
Event venues established in 1990
1990 establishments in England